Nietzsche's critique of the historical subject is based in the rejection of an existing substance in favor of forces and wills combining to form combinations, sometimes in the form of a consciousness. Heidegger later traced the concept of subject to the metaphysical concept of ousia to demonstrate the impossibility of eliminating the subject by simply historicizing it. The contemporary definition of subjectivity, according to Heidegger, recovered Immanuel Kant's definition of the substance in the Critique of Pure Reason and Aristotle's definition of ousia in Metaphysics.

The term "historical subject" is also used by Michel Foucault, as a concept opposed to the eternal and transcendent subject of the juridical and philosophical discourse, yet still identified as an object. Foucault proposes a "historical and political discourse".

See also
Subject (philosophy)

Historiography
Political philosophy
Continental philosophy